Lake Dynda is a freshwater lake in Turukhansky District, Krasnoyarsk Krai, Russia. The lake is located in the Upper Taz Nature Reserve.

Geography
The lake lies in the basin of the Taz river, close to its source, and near the basin of the Yeloguy River which flows to the southeast of the lake. Lake Dynda extends in a roughly northwest–southeast direction.

See also
List of lakes of Russia

References

External links
Live Journal

Dynda
Taz basin